Jeram Patel (1930 — 18 January 2016) was an Indian artist. He was known for using blowtorches on woodwork medium in a method that he learned at Japan and then pioneered in India. Jeram was part of a group of an artists called Group 1890. Patel was known as an abstractionist.

Early life and education 
Patel studied at JJ School of Art, Mumbai. Eventually, he also taught as a faculty member at MS University, Baroda.

Exhibitions and Art Works 

 The dark loam: between memory and membrane hosted at KNMA in October 2016
 India's Indigenous Modernism with other artists

Death 
He died at an age of 86 in 2016 at a hospital in Vadodara where he was admitted for 15 days following a severe cold and congestion.

References 

Indian contemporary painters
20th-century Indian painters
1930 births
2016 deaths
Indian male painters
20th-century Indian male artists
Sir Jamsetjee Jeejebhoy School of Art alumni
Academic staff of Maharaja Sayajirao University of Baroda